= Liquidity smile =

The liquidity smile is an observed feature of many financial markets, particularly equity markets, whereby the volume (and hence the liquidity) is concentrated at the start and particularly the end of the trading day, with relatively thin trading in the middle. If you plot trade volume against time across one trading day, you therefore get a 'smile' shape.

This has increased in recent years as the rise in passive investment causes more and more funds to try to execute at, or close to, the closing price of the day. To do this, they prefer to execute as much volume as possible in the last minutes of the trading day.
